Sir William Lawther (20 May 1889 – 1 February 1976) was a politician and trade union leader in the United Kingdom.

Born in Choppington, in Northumberland, Lawther was educated at Choppington Colliery School, then became a coal miner.  He became active in the Northumberland Miners' Association, which funded him to study at the Central Labour College.

Lawther was active in the Labour Party, standing unsuccessfully for the party in South Shields at the 1922, 1923 and 1924 United Kingdom general elections.  From 1925 to 1929, he served on Durham County Council.  At the 1929 United Kingdom general election, he switched to contest Barnard Castle, winning the seat, though he was defeated in 1931.

Out of Parliament, Lawther returned to trade unionism.  He was elected to the General Council of the Trades Union Congress (TUC) in 1935, and as President of the Miners' Federation of Great Britain (MFGB) in 1939.  The MFGB became the National Union of Mineworkers, with Lawther remaining president.  In 1949, he was President of the TUC, and later that year, he was knighted.

Lawther retired from his trade union posts in 1954, and died in 1976 aged 86.
Since his death, declassified archives have shown that Will Lawther had covertly been working with a secret Cold War propaganda department attached to the British Foreign Office called the Information Research Department, and was paid by the British government to promote anti-communist material.

References

External links 
 
 
 Lawther, Sir William (1889-1976) Knight Politician and Trade Unionist - nationalarchives.gov.uk
 

1889 births
1976 deaths
Presidents of the National Union of Mineworkers (Great Britain)
Vice Presidents of the National Union of Mineworkers (Great Britain)
Labour Party (UK) MPs for English constituencies
Miners' Federation of Great Britain-sponsored MPs
UK MPs 1929–1931
Knights Bachelor
Members of the General Council of the Trades Union Congress
Presidents of the Trades Union Congress
People from Choppington